The following lists events that happened in 1929 in El Salvador.

Incumbents
President: Pío Romero Bosque
Vice President: Gustavo Vides

Events

References

 
El Salvador
1920s in El Salvador
Years of the 20th century in El Salvador
El Salvador